Raising Hell is the third studio album by American hip hop group Run-D.M.C., released on May 15, 1986, by Profile Records. The album was produced by Russell Simmons and Rick Rubin. Raising Hell became the first Platinum and multi-Platinum hip hop record. The album was first certified as Platinum on July 15, 1986, before it was certified as 3× Platinum by the Recording Industry Association of America (RIAA) on April 24, 1987.

Raising Hell peaked at number three on the Billboard 200, and number one on the Top R&B/Hip Hop Albums chart making it the first hip hop record reach atop the latter. The album features four hit singles: "My Adidas", "Walk This Way" (a collaboration with Aerosmith), "You Be Illin'" and "It's Tricky". "Walk This Way" is the group's most famous single, being a groundbreaking rap rock version of Aerosmith's 1975 song "Walk This Way". It is considered to be the first rap rock collaboration that also brought hip-hop into the mainstream and was the first song by a hip hop act to reach the top 5 of the Billboard Hot 100.

Raising Hell has been ranked as one of the greatest albums of all time. In 1987, it was nominated for a Grammy Award, making Run DMC the first hip hop act to receive a nomination. In the same year for this album Run-D.M.C. was nominated for Album of the Year and won Best Rap Album at the 1987 Soul Train Music Awards. In 2018, it was inducted into the National Recording Registry by the Library of Congress as being "culturally, historically, or artistically significant". The album was reissued by Arista Records in 1999 and 2003. An expanded and remastered edition was released in 2005 and contained 5 previously unreleased songs.

Selling more than three million copies, Raising Hell is credited with heralding the golden age of hip hop as well as hip hop's album era, helping the genre achieve an unprecedented level of recognition among critics.

Background 
Returning home to Queens in late 1985 after their extensive touring, they soon put themselves on lockdown at Chung King studios in Manhattan for three months. In place of producer Smith, a cocky new maverick was brought in: Rick Rubin. Even though Rubin's and Russell's names were on the production marquee, the two non-group members oversaw and added to the music on Raising Hell more than created it. "Rick and Russell got production credit, but we [the group members] really did everything", DMC states. "We did that album in like three months. It was so quick because every rhyme was written on the road and had been practiced and polished. We knew what we wanted to do. Rick was all music and instruments. Jay was music and DJing. And me and Run was lyrics. We definitely had a game plan."

Raising Hell features the well-known cover "Walk This Way" featuring Aerosmith (largely the work of its leaders, Steven Tyler and Joe Perry).  While the song was not the group's first fusion of rock and hip hop (the group's earlier singles "Rock Box" and "King of Rock" were), it was the first such fusion significantly impacting the charts, becoming the first rap song to crack the top 5 of The Billboard Hot 100. Raising Hell peaked at No. 1 on Billboard's Top R&B Albums chart as the first hip hop/rap album to do so, and at No. 3 on the Billboard 200.

Reception 

Raising Hell was voted fifth best album of 1986 in the Pazz & Jop poll of American critics nationwide, published by The Village Voice. Robert Christgau, the poll's creator, wrote in a contemporary review: "Without benefit of a 'Rock Box' or 'King of Rock,' this is [Run-D.M.C.'s] most uncompromising and compelling album, all hard beats and declaiming voices."

In the Los Angeles Times, Richard Cromelin wrote: "If the same old boasts are wearing thin and the misogyny gets grating, the beats are infectious and varied and the vocal trade-offs can be dazzling."

It ranked number 8 among the "Albums of the Year" in NME.

In 1987, the Soul Train Music Award for Best Rap - Single was jointly awarded to Run-D.M.C. and Aerosmith for "Walk This Way".

In 1989, the Toronto Star music critics took to look over the albums they had reviewed in the past 10 years to include in a list based on "commercial impact to social import, to strictly musical merit." Raising Hell was placed at number four on the list, describing it as "the record to move rap from the ghetto to the suburbs. Blame it or celebrate it, you can't deny Raising Hell's impact.

In 1998, the album appeared in The Source's 100 Best Rap Albums. Q magazine (12/99, p. 162) – 5 stars out of 5 – "... the apex of pre-Public Enemy, beatbox-based hip hop, a monument of massive, crisp beats plus the genre-bending 'Walk This Way'." Vibe (12/99, p. 162) – Included in Vibe's 100 Essential Albums of the 20th Century. Uncut (11/03, p. 130) – 4 stars out of 5 – "[An album] that forced the music biz to take rap seriously." Rolling Stone (12/11/03, p. 126) – "[T]he pioneering trio took hip-hop into the upper reaches of the pop charts, introducing mainstream to a new urban thunder: rap rock." AllMusic – 5 stars out of 5 – "... the music was fully realized and thoroughly invigorating, rocking harder and better than any of its rock or rap peers in 1986 ..."

In 2003, the album was ranked number 123 on Rolling Stone magazine's list of the 500 greatest albums of all time, maintaining the rating in a 2012 revised list, dropping to number 209 in a 2020 reboot of the list. It ranked fourth on Chris Rock's list of the Top 25 Hip-Hop Albums of all time, and the comedian called it "the first great rap album ever".

In 2006, the album was chosen by Time as one of the 100 greatest albums. Time named it No. 41 of the 100 best albums of the past fifty years and stated that the album was "rap's first masterpiece".

In 2012, Slant Magazine listed the album at No. 65 on its list of "Best Albums of the 1980s".

Public Enemy's Chuck D considers Raising Hell to be the greatest hip-hop album of all-time, and the reason he chose to sign with Def Jam Records. "It paved the way for so many bands," he explained, "and opened minds." In Hip Hop Connection, he ranked the album at number one in his top ten (which also included Tougher Than Leather) and said: "It was the first record that made me realise this was an album-oriented genre."

Track listing

Accolades

Chart positions

Album

Singles

Certifications

References

External links
 Raising Hell at Discogs
 Raising Hell at RapGenius

Raising Hell (Adobe Flash) at Radio3Net (streamed copy where licensed)

1986 albums
Run-DMC albums
Profile Records albums
Arista Records albums
United States National Recording Registry recordings
Albums produced by Rick Rubin
Albums recorded at Chung King Studios
United States National Recording Registry albums